Kane County is a county in the U.S. state of Illinois. According to the 2020 census, it has a population of 516,522, making it the fifth-most populous county in Illinois. Its county seat is Geneva, and its largest city is Aurora. Kane County is one of the collar counties of the metropolitan statistical area designated "Chicago–Naperville–Elgin, IL–IN–WI" by the US Census.

History
Kane County was formed out of LaSalle County in 1836. The county was named in honor of Elias Kane, United States Senator from Illinois, and the first Secretary of State of Illinois.

Geography
Its largest cities are along the Fox River.

Climate

Adjacent counties
 McHenry County (north)
 Cook County (east)
 DuPage County (east)
 Will County (southeast)
 Kendall County (south)
 DeKalb County (west)

Parks and recreation
 Fox River Trail
 Great Western Trail
 Illinois Prairie Path
 James "Pate" Philip State Park

Forest preserves
Kane County has an extensive forest preserve program, with numerous nature preserves, historic sites, and trails.

 Almon Underwood Prairie
 Andersen Woods
 Arlene Shoemaker
 Aurora West
 Barnes
 Big Rock Forest Preserve & Campground
 Binnie Forest Preserve
 Blackberry Maples
 Bliss Woods
 Bolcum Road Wetlands
 Bowes Creek Greenway Forest Preserve
 Bowes Creek Woods Forest Preserve
 Braeburn Marsh
 Brewster Creek Forest Preserve
 Brunner Family
 Buffalo Park Forest Preserve
 Burlington Prairie
 Burnidge Forest Preserve/Paul Wolff Campground
 Camp Tomo Chi-Chi Knolls
 Campton
 Cardinal Creek
 Culver
 Deer Valley Golf Course
 Dick Young
 Eagles Forest Preserve
 Edgewater Greenway Forest Preserve
 Elburn Forest Preserve
 Elgin Shores
 Fabyan
 Ferson Creek
 Fitchie Creek
 Fox River Bluff East & Fox River Bluff West
 Fox River Forested Fen Forest Preserve
 Fox River Shores
 Freeman Kame – Meagher
 Glenwood Park Forest Preserve
 Grunwald Farms
 Gunnar Anderson
 Hampshire Forest Preserve
 Hampshire South Forest Preserve
 Hannaford Woods/Nickels Farm
 Helm Woods
 Hoscheit Woods Forest Preserve
 Hughes Creek Golf Club
 Jack E. Cook Park & Forest Preserve
 Jelkes Creek
 Johnson's Mound
 Jon J. Duerr
 Kenyon Farm
 Lake Run Forest Preserve
 LeRoy Oakes
 Les Arends
 Lone Grove Forest Preserve
 McLean Fen Forest Preserve
 Meissner Prairie – Corron
 Mill Creek
 Muirhead Springs
 New Haven Park
 Oakhurst
 Otter Creek
 Pingree Grove Forest Preserve
 Poplar Creek
 Prairie Green
 Raceway Woods
 Raymond Street
 Regole
 Rutland Forest Preserve
 Sauer Family Prairie Kame
 Schweitzer Woods
 Settler's Hill
 Sleepy Hollow Ravine
 Tekakwitha Woods
 Tyler Creek Forest Preserve
 Virgil Forest Preserve
 Voyageur's Landing
 Willoughby Farms

Demographics

As of the 2010 census, there were 515,269 people, 170,479 households, and 128,323 families residing in the county. The racial makeup of the county was 74.6% white, 5.7% black or African American, 3.5% Asian, 0.6% American Indian, 13.0% from other races, and 2.6% from two or more races. Those of Hispanic or Latino origin made up 30.7% of the population. In terms of ancestry, 24.3% were German, 13.0% were Irish, 7.9% were Polish, 7.4% were Italian, 7.1% were English, and 2.4% were American.

Of the 170,479 households, 42.3% had children under the age of 18 living with them, 59.2% were married couples living together, 11.0% had a female householder with no husband present, 24.7% were non-families, and 19.8% of all households were made up of individuals. The average household size was 2.98 and the average family size was 3.45. The median age was 34.5 years.

The median income for a household in the county was $67,767 and the median income for a family was $77,998. Males had a median income of $53,833 versus $39,206 for females. The per capita income for the county was $29,480. About 7.0% of families and 9.1% of the population were below the poverty line, including 13.5% of those under age 18 and 5.7% of those age 65 or over.

Education
 Aurora University
 Elgin Community College
 Judson University
 Waubonsee Community College

Infrastructure

Health care
There are several hospitals serving the county:
 Advocate Sherman Hospital, Elgin
 Northwestern Medicine Delnor Hospital, Geneva
 Presence Mercy Medical Center, Aurora
 Presence Saint Joseph Hospital, Elgin
 Rush-Copley Medical Center, Aurora

Transportation
 Metra
 Pace

Airport
 Aurora Municipal Airport

Major highways
Kane county has an extensive county highway system that includes federal, state and county maintained routes.  During the years that the county was represented by Dennis Hastert it received many federal earmarks for highway improvements to respond to population growth.  In addition, the county has entered into an agreement with the Illinois State Toll Highway Authority to operate a limited access toll bridge on the Longmeadow Parkway that is not connected to any other tollway.

  Interstate 88
  Interstate 90
  U.S. Highway 20
  U.S. Highway 30
  U.S. Highway 34
  Illinois Route 19
  Illinois Route 25
  Illinois Route 31
  Illinois Route 38
  Illinois Route 47
  Illinois Route 56
  Illinois Route 58
  Illinois Route 62
  Illinois Route 64
  Illinois Route 68
  Illinois Route 72
  Illinois Route 110
  Army Trail Road
  Randall Road
  Longmeadow Parkway
 Kane County Route 37
 Lake Cook Road

Communities

Cities
 Aurora (mostly)
 Batavia (mostly)
 Elgin (mostly)
 Geneva
 St. Charles (mostly)

Villages

 Algonquin (part)
 Barrington Hills (part)
 Bartlett (part)
 Big Rock
 Burlington
 Campton Hills
 Carpentersville
 East Dundee (mostly)
 Elburn
 Gilberts
 Hampshire
 Hoffman Estates (part)
 Huntley (part)
 Kaneville
 Lily Lake
 Maple Park (part)
 Montgomery (mostly)
 North Aurora
 Pingree Grove
 Sleepy Hollow
 South Elgin
 Sugar Grove
 Virgil
 Wayne (part)
 West Dundee

Census-designated place
 Prestbury

Other unincorporated communities

 Allens Corners
 Almora
 Bald Mound
 Bowes
 Five Island Park
 Freeman
 La Fox
 Mooseheart
 North Plato
 Nottingham Woods
 Plato Center
 Rainbow Hills
 Starks
 Udina
 Valley View
 Wasco

Townships

 Aurora Township
 Batavia Township
 Big Rock Township
 Blackberry Township
 Burlington Township
 Campton Township
 Dundee Township
 Elgin Township
 Geneva Township
 Hampshire Township
 Kaneville Township
 Plato Township
 Rutland Township
 St. Charles Township
 Sugar Grove Township
 Virgil Township

Politics
Kane County is coterminous with the 16th Judicial Circuit. The 16th Judicial Circuit is divided into four subcircuits. The first subcircuit consists of the majority of Aurora Township. The second subcircuit consists of most of Elgin and Dundee townships. The fourth subcircuit consists the tri-cities area of Batavia, Geneva, and Saint Charles. The third subcircuit consists of all territory not included in the other three subcircuits, which corresponds to an area of roughly the western two thirds of the county.

As one of the Yankee-settled and prosperous suburban “collar counties”, Kane County was a stronghold of the Free Soil Party in its first few elections, being one of nine Illinois counties to give a plurality to Martin van Buren in 1848. Kane County then unsurprisingly became solidly Republican for the century and a half following that party's formation. It voted for the GOP presidential nominee in every election between 1856 and 2004 except that of 1912 when the Republican Party was mortally divided and Progressive Theodore Roosevelt carried the county with a majority of the vote over conservative incumbent William Howard Taft.

The gradual shift of the GOP towards white Southern Evangelicals, however, has led the generally moderate electorate of Kane and the other “collar counties” to trend towards the Democratic Party. In 2008, then-Illinois Senator Barack Obama became the first Democrat to carry Kane County since Franklin Pierce in 1852, and the first ever to win an absolute majority of the county's vote (the previous two Democratic winners, Pierce and James K. Polk in 1844 had both gained only pluralities due to strong Free Soil votes). Obama won a plurality in 2012, and Hillary Clinton improved upon Obama's showing to become the second Democrat to win a majority in 2016. In 2020, Joe Biden had the best performance ever by a Democrat in the county, even besting Obama's 2008 victory.

See also

 Dundee Township Park District
 Fermilab
 Fox River (Illinois River tributary)
 Golden Corridor
 Illinois Technology and Research Corridor
 National Register of Historic Places listings in Kane County, Illinois
 Tri-Cities, Illinois

Notable people
Patricia Golden
Frank D. Weir

References

General

External links

 Kane County government website

 
1836 establishments in Illinois
Chicago metropolitan area
Illinois counties
Populated places established in 1836